Nocturne is the third EP by South Korean boy band 2AM. It was released in November 27, 2013 with the song "Regret" as the title track. 
Prior to the official release of their third EP, 2AM  pre-released 'Just Stay' from their third mini album 'Nocturne' on November 19, 2013.
'Just Stay' is a soft R&B that is calm and soothing. It is about a girl who is having troubles with her lover and a man who is in love with that girl.
The song 'Only You' is reminiscent of nineties K-Pop and R&B, which makes this one of the standout tracks in regard to the evolution of 2AM. 'To An Angel' is also more uptempo than the songs that 2AM is known for and is a solid pop song. 'You’re Prettier The More I See You' is very jazzy. It's the last 2AM album to be released under Big Hit, before their transition back to JYP Entertainment.

Track listing

References

External links 
 
 

2013 EPs
2AM (band) albums
JYP Entertainment EPs
Korean-language EPs
Hybe Corporation EPs